Tadao (written: 忠雄, 忠夫, 忠男, 忠生, 忠郎 or 理男) is a masculine Japanese given name. Notable people with the name include:

, Japanese architect
, Japanese daimyō
Tadao Baba (born 1944), Japanese motorcycle engineer
, Japanese banker
, Japanese photographer
, Japanese footballer and manager
, Japanese screenwriter and film director
, Japanese information theorist
Tadao Kikumoto, Japanese inventor and engineer
, Japanese shogi player
, Japanese footballer and manager
, Japanese photographer
, Japanese anime director
Tadao Nakamura (born 1947), Japanese golfer
, Japanese mathematician
, Japanese footballer
, Japanese film critic and theorist
, Japanese musician
, Japanese astronomer and translator
, Japanese footballer
, Japanese mathematician
, Japanese photographer
Tadao Tomomatsu, American actor
, Japanese diver
, Japanese long-distance runner
, Japanese gymnast
, Japanese anthropologist
, Japanese politician
, Japanese economist and academic
, Japanese sumo and professional wrestler

Fictional characters
, a character in the manga series Lucky Star
, a character in the manga series Ghost Sweeper Mikami

Japanese masculine given names